Kapodistrias is a Greek form of Italian surname Capodistria. Notable people with the surname include three brothers: 

 Ioannis Kapodistrias, Greek diplomat and Foreign Minister of the Russian Empire and later the first head of state of independent Greece
 Augustinos Kapodistrias, Greek soldier and politician 
 Viaros Kapodistrias

See also
 Koper, Slovenian city –historically a Venetian city– known in Italian as Capo d'Istria or Capodistria

Greek-language surnames
Surnames of Italian origin